Leucopaxillus gentianeus is a bitter-tasting, inedible mushroom commonly known as the bitter false funnelcap, or the bitter brown leucopaxillus. A common synonym is Leucopaxillus amarus. The bitter taste is caused by a triterpene called cucurbitacin B. The species was first described in 1873 as Clitocybe gentianea by French mycologist Lucien Quélet. František Kotlaba transferred it to Leucopaxillus in 1966.

References

External links
Mushroom Expert Description and more information

Tricholomataceae
Fungi described in 1873
Fungi of Europe
Fungi of North America
Fungi found in fairy rings